PMSM may refer to:
 Police Medal for Meritorious Service, a civil service award in Hong Kong
 Permanent-Magnet Synchronous Motor, a type of motor